Yazaldes Valdemar Nascimento Alfonso (born 17 April 1986) is a Portuguese athlete who specializes in the 100 metres.

Participating in the 2004 Summer Olympics, Nascimento achieved eighth place in his 100 m heat, thus missing out on a placing in Round 2 of the event. He did however achieve a personal best time with 11.00 seconds. He also competed at the 2005 World Championships.

Born in São Tomé and Príncipe, Nascimento became a Portuguese citizen in 12 June 2007. Before changing nationality he set the current São Tomé and Príncipe record in high jump with 1.98 m.

His personal best time in the 100 metres is 10.16, achieved in 2015 in Madrid.

References

External links
 
 Profile at Olympic Committee of Portugal 

1986 births
Living people
Portuguese male sprinters
Athletes (track and field) at the 2004 Summer Olympics
Olympic athletes of São Tomé and Príncipe
São Tomé and Príncipe male sprinters
São Tomé and Príncipe emigrants to Portugal
S.L. Benfica athletes
World Athletics Championships athletes for São Tomé and Príncipe
World Athletics Championships athletes for Portugal
Athletes (track and field) at the 2016 Summer Olympics
Olympic athletes of Portugal
People from São Tomé

Portuguese people of São Tomé and Príncipe descent